Tonya (Ancient Greek: Thoania, Θωανία; Ottoman Turkish: طﻮﻧﻴﻪ, romanized as Tonya) is a town and district of Trabzon Province in the Black Sea region of Turkey. The mayor is Osman Beşel (AKP).

References

External links
District governor's official website 
District municipality's official website 
Tonyahaber website http://www.tonyahaber.net  
 Tonya

Populated places in Trabzon Province
Districts of Trabzon Province